Kapalkundala is a Bengali romance novel by Indian writer Bankim Chandra Chattopadhyay. Published in 1866, it is a story of a forest-dwelling girl named Kapalkundala, who fell in love with and married Nabakumar, a young gentleman from Saptagram, but eventually found that she is unable to adjust herself with the city life. Following the success of Chattopadhyay's first novel Durgeshnandini, he decided to write about a girl who is brought up in a remote forest by a Kapalika (Tantrik sage) and never saw anyone but her foster-father. The story is set in Dariapur, Contai in modern-day Purba Medinipur district, Paschimbanga (West Bengal) where Chattopadhyay served as a Deputy Magistrate and Deputy Collector.

Kapalkundala is considered one of the finest and the most popular of Chattopadhyay's novels. It has been translated into English, German, Hindi, Gujrati, Tamil, Telugu and Sanskrit. Girish Chandra Ghosh, one of the pioneers of Bengali drama, and Atul Krishna Mitra dramatized the novel separately.

Synopsis
Nabakumar, a young gentleman from Saptagram, got lost in a forest while returning from pilgrimage in Gangasagar. He met a Tantric sage who trapped him, intending to make him a sacrifice to goddess Shamshaan
Kali; but was later freed secretly by Kapalkundala, the sage's foster-daughter. She, at once, fell in love with Nabakumar and with the help of a village priest they got married on the next day. The priest urged Nabakumar to take Kapalkundala away from her wicked foster-father and also showed Nabakumar his way to Saptagram. Nabakumar returned home with his newly-wed wife Kapalkundala, now re-christened as Mrinmoyee. The sage, on the other hand, got annoyed at Kapalkundala's betrayal and began to plot his revenge. In the meantime, Nabakumar met Padmabati, his first wife, who was converted to Islam by his father, making Nabakumar to desert her. Padmabati, now renamed as Motibibi, expressed her love for Nabakumar, but he refused her. Later the sage came to Saptagram and met Motibibi. The sage wanted to kill Kapalkundala, but Motibibi wanted to separate her from Nabkumar only. They made a plot to prove Kapalkundala unfaithful. Padmabati called Kapalkundala to meet her in a nearby forest and she, herself, came there in a man's disguise. The sage showed Nabakumar that Kapalkundala came out at night to meet a ‘man whom she loves’. Then the sage made the angry Nabakumar bring Kapalkundala to the sacrificial ground where Kapalkundala revealed the truth to him. Nabakumar came to his senses and he asked Kapalkundala to come with him to his home, but she refused and jumped into the river. Nabakumar also jumped into the river to save her, but both of them were lost.

Sequel
In 1874, Damodar Mukhopadhyay, a relative of Chattopadhyay, wrote Mrinmayee, a sequel to Kapalkundala. Mukhopadhyay also wrote Nabab-Nandini, a sequel to Chattopadhyay's first work Durgeshnandini, in 1901.

In adaptation

Films
Bengali
1929: Kapalkundala, starring Durgadas Bannerjee, Indira Devi, Sita Devi, directed by Priyanath N. Ganguly.
1933: Kapalkundala, starring Durgadas Bannerjee, Manoranjan Bhattacharya and Molina Devi, directed by Premankur Atorthy.
1952: Kapalkundala, directed by Ardhendu Mukherjee.
1981: Kapalkundala, starring Bhanu Banerjee, Ranjit Mallick, Mahua Roy Chowdhury, directed by Pinaki Bhushan Mukherji.

Hindi
1939: Kapal Kundala, starring  Sailen Choudhury, Leela Desai and Najmul Hussain, directed by Nitin Bose, Phani Majumdar.

Television
Kapal Kundala, a television series based on the aired on DD National.
2019-20: Kapalkundala, an Indian Bengali television soap opera that aired on Star Jalsha.

Others
It was adapted as a comic by Debrani Mitra in the 720th issue of the Indian comic book series, Amar Chitra Katha.

References

External links
 

Novels by Bankim Chandra Chattopadhyay
1866 novels
Bengali-language literature
Indian Bengali-language novels
Novels adapted into comics
Indian novels adapted into films
Indian novels adapted into television shows
19th-century Indian novels